Eric Pang (born 30 January 1982) is a Dutch badminton player, who became European Junior Champion in 2001. He won the National Dutch Championships seven times between 2009 and 2015.

Career 
As a part of the BC Amersfoort team Pang reached the final of the European Cup 2007 held in Amersfoort. Together with Lotte Bruil-Jonathans, Yao Jie, Larisa Griga, Dicky Palyama and Chris Bruil. The final was lost against the team of NL Primorje. In the semi finals they were too strong for CB Rinconada.

Eric Pang won the Norwegian International in 2005 and the Spanish Open in 2010. In 2012 Eric Pang won the Yonex Dutch Open Grand Prix beating his compatriot Dicky Palyama in the final with straight games.

Personal life 
Eric Pang was born to a Chinese Singaporean father and Dutch mother. His Chinese name is Fang Facai. He married Yao Jie in 2009, who later also became his coach.

Achievements

European Junior Championships 
Boys' singles

BWF Grand Prix (1 title, 3 runners-up) 
The BWF Grand Prix has two levels, the BWF Grand Prix and Grand Prix Gold. It is a series of badminton tournaments sanctioned by the Badminton World Federation (BWF) since 2007.

Men's singles

 BWF Grand Prix tournament
 BWF Grand Prix Gold tournament

BWF International Challenge/Series (4 titles, 11 runners-up) 
Men's singles

 BWF International Challenge tournament
 BWF International Series tournament

References

External links 

 

1982 births
Living people
Sportspeople from Groningen (city)
Dutch people of Indonesian descent
Dutch people of Chinese descent
Dutch male badminton players
Badminton players at the 2015 European Games
European Games competitors for the Netherlands